Dianna Wolfson is an officer in the United States Navy who is the first woman to lead an American Naval Shipyard, and currently serves as the 110th Commander of the Norfolk Naval Shipyard. From June 2019 to December 2020 she served as the 50th Commander of the Puget Sound Naval Shipyard.

Naval career 

Education 
Wolfson graduated from the United States Merchant Marine Academy in 1996 with a Bachelor of Science degree in Marine Systems Engineering (Magna Cum Laude). She also received a Master of Science degree in Civil and Environmental Engineering and a Naval Engineer's Degree from the Massachusetts Institute of Technology in 2004.

Awards and decorations 
Dianna Wolfson has received the Legion of Merit, the Meritorious Service Medal (four awards), the Navy and Marine Corps Commendation Medal (two awards), the Navy and Marine Corps Achievement Medal (four awards), and a number of unit awards.

References 

21st-century American naval officers
Living people
Massachusetts Institute of Technology alumni
United States Merchant Marine Academy alumni
Year of birth missing (living people)